The Essex Green is an American indie rock band from Brooklyn that has released four albums to date. The band is primarily composed of songwriters Jeff Baron, Sasha Bell and Chris Ziter, and specializes in a classic sound inspired by 1960s–1970s pop and folk in the tradition of bands like The Left Banke and Fairport Convention.

History
The band formed from the ashes of the Burlington, Vermont band Guppyboy when members Baron, Bell, Ziter and Michael Barrett moved to Brooklyn. The Essex Green formed in 1997, adding drummer Tim Barnes, and began to play shows around New York. They issued a split-7" single with The Sixth Great Lake (a Guppyboy/Essex Green-related side project) in 1999.  They were asked by Robert Schneider to be a part of The Elephant Six Collective and recorded a self-titled EP, later signing to Kindercore Records, who released their first full-length album later that year. After a number of tours and the release of some EPs and singles, the group signed with Merge Records who released their second album in 2003.  After a world tour, they headed back to the studio in fall of 2005 to begin work on their third album, Cannibal Sea, which was released in March 2006. Their fourth album, ‘Hardly Electronic’ was released in 2018.

Discography

Albums
 The Brooklyn Basement Tapes Volume One - 1997
 The Brooklyn Basement Tapes Volume Two - 1997
 Everything Is Green  - Kindercore - 1999
 The Long Goodbye - Merge Records - 2003
 Cannibal Sea - Merge Records - 2006
 Hardly Electronic - Merge Records - 2018

Singles and EPs
 Split single with The Sixth Great Lake (7-inch) - Sudden Shame - 1999
 Essex Green EP  - Elephant6 - 1999
 Happy Happy Birthday to Me Singles Club: April (7-inch) - HHBTM - 2000
 Split single with The Smallgoods (7-inch) - Low Transit Industries - 2003

External links
 The Essex Green, official site
 
 
 Guppyboy
Video: Essex Green performs The Long Way Around for the Swedish site PSL

The Elephant 6 Recording Company artists
Indie rock musical groups from New York (state)
Indie pop groups from New York (state)
Musical groups from Brooklyn
Merge Records artists
Low Transit Industries artists